Tenley Nora Molzahn Leopold (born May 19, 1984) is an American dancer and television personality known for her appearances as a cast member on three ABC reality shows, The Bachelor: On the Wings of Love (2010),  Bachelor Pad (2010), and  Bachelor in Paradise (2015).

Dancing
In 2002, Molzahn moved to Los Angeles to audition for Walt Disney Productions. For the next six years, Molzahn danced and performed in Disney in Anaheim and Japan, taking the lead role of Ariel in Tokyo Disney’s ‘Under the Sea’ tour for nine months.

Television
Molzahn's work in television began when she was selected as a cast member on ABC's reality show The Bachelor series which first aired on January 4, 2010. The show placed her with twenty-four other women all contending for the affection of pilot Jake Pavelka. She was the last one eliminated by Pavelka.

Afterwards, Molzahn joined the cast of Bachelor Pad, the ABC dating-based competition reality TV show in which former contestants from The Bachelor and The Bachelorette compete and play games for a chance at a $250,000 cash prize. The show premiered August 9, 2010 on ABC.

Personal life
Prior to appearing on The Bachelor, Molzahn had been married to Ryan Natividad. They divorced in 2009.

On January 12, 2018, Molzahn became engaged to Taylor Leopold, whom she had been dating for two years. They were married on April 27, 2018. On March 24, 2020, they announced on Instagram that they are expecting their first child in September. On September 20, 2020, they welcomed a girl named Rell Jaymes.

References

1984 births
Living people
People from Newberg, Oregon
American female dancers
American dancers
Walt Disney Parks and Resorts people
Bachelor Nation contestants